Cardinal Ambrozic Catholic Secondary School is a separate high school located in Brampton, Ontario, Canada, named after Aloysius Ambrozic. The school is part of the Dufferin-Peel Catholic District School Board. The uniform consists of a burgundy golf shirt, a burgundy zipper sweater and khaki pants. It ranked 130 of 749 schools in Ontario in 2018/2019. This school is a traditional Catholic school. It was named in honour of Cardinal Ambrozic who died in August 2011. Notable people who attended this school include Alessia Cara.

Cardinal Ambrozic CSS was featured in multiple news stories on March 22, 2017, when roughly one hundred parents slept outside the school in order to register their children for grade 9 at 7:30am that morning. The first parent in line arrived at the school at 12pm the day prior.

Notable alumni

 Alessia Cara, singer-songwriter

Feeder schools
 Fr. Francis McSpiritt Catholic Elementary School
 Holy Spirit Catholic Elementary School
 Our Lady of Lourdes Catholic Elementary School
 St. Andre Bessette Catholic Elementary School
 St. Patrick Catholic Elementary School (South of Mayfield Road)
 Father Clair Tipping Catholic Elementary School

See also
 Aloysius Ambrozic, namesake
List of high schools in Ontario

References

External links
School profile at the Education Quality and Accountability Office (EQAO)

Educational institutions established in 2009
High schools in Brampton
Catholic secondary schools in Ontario
2009 establishments in Ontario